121288 Uživo (trans. 121288 Live) is the first live album by Serbian and Yugoslav hard rock band Kerber, released in 1989.

Recording
The album was recorded on Kerber concert in Belgrade Youth Center held on 12 December 1988 (thus 121288 in the album title) and produced by the band themselves. The concert was part of the promotional tour for the band's fourth studio album, Ljudi i bogovi (Humans and Gods). 121288 Uživo was the band's first album recorded with bass guitarist Branko Isaković, who came to the band as the replacement for the band's original bass guitarist Zoran Žikić.

Track listing

Personnel
Goran Šepa – vocals
Tomislav Nikolić – guitar
Branislav Božinović – keyboard
Branko Isaković – bass guitar
Dragoljub Đuričić – drums

Additional personnel
Dražen Sužnjević - recorded by
Dragan Vukićević - mixed by

Reception
The album was hastily recorded and mixed, and as a result not well received by fans and music critics.

References

121288 Uživo at Discogs

External links
121288 Uživo at Discogs

Kerber live albums
1989 live albums
PGP-RTB live albums
Serbian-language live albums